Arthur Mafokate (born 10 July 1964) is a South African kwaito musician and producer. In 1994, he released his debut album titled Windy Windy with the hit track "Amagents Ayaphanda”.

Life and career

Early life 
Arthur Mafokate was born on July 10, 1962. He is the son of Olympic equestrian and philanthropist Enos Mafokate and the brother of the late kwaito star Oupa Makhendlas Mafokate. He was born in Soweto, Gauteng Province but his family later moved to Midrand. He became a backing dancer for artists including Brenda Fassie, Monwa & Son and Johnny Mokhali.

First Kwaito Hit
He released the first kwaito hit with his 1995 song "Kaffir" which to date has sold over 500,000 copies. Its lyrics reflect the new freedoms that emerged after the political changes of 1994, including the implementation of a new constitution and democratic election system. The title, "Kaffir," is a derogatory term used mostly in South Africa as a racial slur to refer to black people. In his song, Mafokate protests against the use of the word "kaffir," claiming that his employer (called "baas" or boss) would not like to be referred to as "bobbejaan," or baboon.

At the 2021 Mzansi Kwaito and House Music Awards, his single "Hlokoloza" received a nomination for Best Kwaito song.

Controversy 
In 2017, the artist Cici, who was then his partner and signed to Mafokate's label, accused him of physical abuse during the time they were living together. Cici had a serious injury and had to be treated in a hospital. He was arrested and released on bail pending a court case. After Cici posted images showing the injuries she sustained, widespread condemnation on Mafokate led to cancelling of the 100MenMarch which was a march to highlight gender based violence perpetrated by mostly men against women and children. Mafokate denied all allegations and was found not guilty by Midrand Magistrate court in 2019.

On 13 January 2023 Arthur Mafokate was alleged to be involved in the misappropriation of R56m in community development funds from the National Lotteries Commission.
The Special Investigating Unit (SIU) obtained a preservation order to freeze a plot, a farm and three luxury properties valued at R53m, one of which belongs to music legend Arthur Mafokate. The properties are linked to fraud and corruption at the National Lotteries Commission (NLC).

Allegations of unlawful enrichment at SAMRO 
In 2019 the Southern African Music Rights Organisation (SAMRO) sued Mafokate for unlawful enrichment. According to the court case, Mafokate and a number of other members of the leadership of SAMRO overpaid themselves by more than R1.6 Million rand. Mafokate himself was irregularly overpaid by R84 000. 

SAMRO would later become the centre of a scandal regarding the underpayment of royalties to artists, much of this taking place during Mafokate's time working for the organisation.

Awards
In 1998 he won the Song of the Year for his song Oyi Oyi at the SAMA FNB Awards. Mafokate, credited as the King of Kwaito, was the first artist to win the South African Music Awards category of The Song of the Year as voted for by the public. He was recognised for his contribution to this new generation of music at the 2007 FNB South African Music Awards. His victory in the 'Song of the Year' category, depicts the peculiar popularity of a music genre which does not analyse the historical black struggle like traditional South African music has often done. The genre of Kwaito music resulted from "the lifting of sanctions in South Africa which provided musicians with easier access to international music tracks and a radical revision of censorship, while the easing political situation allowed for greater freedom of expression. Freedom of expression meant that for the first time, the youth of South Africa could make their voices heard". Making his voice heard through the song Oyi Oyi, Mafokate hit a particular note with South African audiences "in a year when the competition was strong, indicating his enduring appeal for his hundreds of thousands of fans". Unlike the often apolitical characteristics of kwaito music, Mafokate does address the lower class black experience in South Africa in much of his music as is revealed in the lyrics of "Kaffir". Mafokate describes his success in these words: "I commit myself in everything that I do. Give me a script now to portray a character, for example, and you’ll see my dedication. I’d never claim my looks have anything to do with my success. It’s entirely what comes from within me".
Arthur was honored at the 2016 South African Metro FM Music Awards with the Lifetime Achievement Award for recognition of his 22-year-old successful entertainment career.

Discography

Albums 

 1994: Windy Windy
 1994: Scamtho
 1995: Kaffir
 1996: Die Poppe Sal Dans
 1997: Oyi Oyi
 1998: Chomi
 1999: Umpostoli
 2000: Mnike
 2001: Seven Phezulu
 2002: Haai Bo
 2003: Skulvyt
 2004: Mamarela
 2005: Sika
 2006: Vanilla & Chocolate
 2007: Dankie
 2007: Arthur Vs DJ Mbuso: Round 1
 2008: Kwaito Meets House
 2011: Hlokoloza
 2013: Kommander

References

External links
 Arthut Mafokate on music.org.za

Living people
South African musicians
Kwaito musicians
People from Rustenburg
1962 births